This page is a timeline of the major events in the history of animal welfare and rights in Europe.

Big picture

Full timeline

See also
Timeline of animal welfare and rights
Timeline of animal welfare and rights in the United States
History of vegetarianism
List of animal rights advocates
Animal welfare in the United States
Animal welfare and rights in India
Animal welfare and rights in China
Animal consciousness
Speciesism

References

Europe
Europe
Animal welfare and rights legislation